Tame Bridge Parkway is a railway station in the north of the borough of Sandwell, in the West Midlands, England, close to the boundary with Walsall. The station is operated by West Midlands Railway.

The station was opened by British Rail in 1990, having been built at a cost of £600,000. It takes its name from the nearby River Tame.

Pedestrian and vehicular access is via the A4031 Walsall Road.

Services
As of 2021, the following services call at this station on Mondays to Saturdays:
 2tph to Birmingham New Street via Aston, calling at all stations
 3tph non-stop to Birmingham New Street
 2tph to Walsall calling at call stations
 2tph to Rugeley Trent Valley, non-stop to Walsall and then calling at all stations
 1tph to Crewe, via Wolverhampton, Stafford and Stoke-on-Trent
On Sundays and holidays services are 1tph for each of the above.

All services are provided by West Midlands Trains under the brand West Midlands Railway, with services to and from Crewe branded as London Northwestern Railway services.

In 2019, some services ran to and from Birmingham International, Coventry or even London Euston, and were therefore branded as London Northwestern Railway services.

Notes

External links

Rail Around Birmingham and the West Midlands: Tame Bridge Parkway railway station

Railway stations in Sandwell
DfT Category E stations
Railway stations opened by British Rail
Railway stations in Great Britain opened in 1990
Railway stations served by West Midlands Trains